Liu Haichao (born 22 March 1998) is a Chinese badminton player from Shanghai. He was part of the national junior team that won the gold medal at the 2016 Asian and World Junior Championships, also won the bronze medal in the boys' singles at the Asian Junior Championships. He won his first senior international title at the 2018 Scottish Open.

Achievements

Asian Junior Championships 
Boys' singles

BWF World Tour (1 title, 1 runner-up) 
The BWF World Tour, which was announced on 19 March 2017 and implemented in 2018, is a series of elite badminton tournaments sanctioned by the Badminton World Federation (BWF). The BWF World Tour is divided into levels of World Tour Finals, Super 1000, Super 750, Super 500, Super 300 (part of the HSBC World Tour), and the BWF Tour Super 100.

Men's singles

BWF International Challenge/Series (1 title)
Men's singles

  BWF International Challenge tournament
  BWF International Series tournament
  BWF Future Series tournament

References

External links 

Living people
1998 births
Badminton players from Shanghai
Chinese male badminton players
21st-century Chinese people